Tracy Wilson,  (born September 25, 1961) is a Canadian former competitive ice dancer. With partner Rob McCall, she won the Canadian national championship seven times (1982–1988), is a three-time World bronze medallist, and the 1988 Olympic bronze medallist.

Personal life
Tracy Wilson was born on September 25, 1961 in Lachine, Quebec, Canada. She grew up in Port Moody, British Columbia. As child she did swimming and diving, competing at provincials three times. She first swam with the Coquitlam Sharks in 1967 before moving, in 1970, to Port Moody Aquarians. She attended college for one semester before her partnership with Rob McCall began.

In 1987, Wilson married Brad Kinsella. Though she did not change her name at the time, her name is sometimes printed as Tracy Wilson-Kinsella or Tracy Wilson Kinsella. Together they have three children – two sons who play hockey and a daughter who competes as an equestrian. They live in Toronto, Ontario.

Skating career
Wilson started skating when she was six years old in Coquitlam. After moving she became a member of Port Moody's Inlet Skating Club. She competed in ice dancing for the first time when she was fifteen. On the junior level, Wilson competed with Mark Stokes. They were the 1980 Canadian junior national champions.

In the summer of 1981, Wilson teamed up with Rob McCall. Their partnership started at the Elgin Barrow Arena in Richmond Hill, Ontario and they trained in Richmond Hill throughout their competitive careers. Together they won the Canadian national championship seven times, from 1982–1988. They won the Skate Canada International competition in 1983 and 1987. The 1983 gold was the first time a Canadian team won the event. The pair were three-time World bronze medallists (1986-1988). They competed at the 1984 Winter Olympic and the 1988 Winter Olympic, winning a bronze medal in the 1988 Games. That medal was Canada's first Olympic medal in ice dancing.

After the 1988 Worlds, they decided to go pro. They competed in professional competition, including winning the World Professional Championships in 1989. The team also performed with Stars on Ice for two years and other shows. In March/April 1990, McCall was diagnosed with AIDS and his health was deteriorating. Disregarding the mass public fear of AIDS at the time, Wilson continued to skate with McCall. The pair did some shows and skated at the 1990 World Professional Championships. Wilson had to stop skating with the birth of her first child in 1991. Soon after McCall deteriorated further and he died November 15, 1991. Wilson retired from ice dancing, but she did skate a solo, while pregnant with her second child, at the tribute show for McCall on November 21, 1992.

Results
(with McCall)

(with Stokes)

Coaching career
In 2006, Wilson and Brian Orser were hired by the Toronto Cricket Skating and Curling Club as consultants to help rebuild the skating program. The two decided to stay and coach there, training kids, adults, and elite skaters.

Her current students include: 
  Junhwan Cha
  Rika Kihira
  Jason Brown
  Jin Boyang
Her former students include: 
  Yuzuru Hanyu
  Evgenia Medvedeva
  Nam Nguyen
  Lubov Iliushechkina / Dylan Moscovitch
  Javier Fernandez
  Sonia Lafuente
  Utana Yoshida / Shingo Nishiyama

Other ventures
Since 1990, Wilson has worked as a television figure skating analyst for American and Canadian networks, including CBS, NBC, CBC, CTV (TSN), ABC, and Turner Sports (TNT). She has also written several articles for TSN's website.

Wilson has also done some choreography, including for Canadian junior ice dance team Edrea Khong / Edbert Khong.

Wilson is also an AIDS activist. She was one of the primary organizers of the "Skate the Dream: A Tribute to Rob McCall" ice show, a fundraiser for AIDS research, which took place on November 21, 1992.

She is an ambassador for S'port for Kids Foundation, a charitable organization whose goal is to involve kids in organized athletics.

Awards and recognition
In 1988, Wilson and McCall were made Members of the Order of Canada. This is the highest civilian honor given by the Canadian government.

Wilson was also inducted into several halls of fame, including:
 1989 – Canadian Olympic Hall of Fame
 1991 – BC Sports Hall of Fame
 1999 – Richmond Hill Sports Hall of Fame
 2003 – Skate Canada Hall of Fame
 2005 – BC Summer Swimming Association Pool of Fame

In 1995, the Tracy Wilson and Rob McCall Trophy was established to annually recognize a Canadian pairs team. Past winners included pairs in rowing, bobsleigh, and tennis.

References

Living people
1961 births
Canadian female ice dancers
Figure skaters at the 1984 Winter Olympics
Figure skaters at the 1988 Winter Olympics
Medalists at the 1988 Winter Olympics
Olympic bronze medalists for Canada
Olympic figure skaters of Canada
Olympic medalists in figure skating
World Figure Skating Championships medalists
Canadian sports announcers
Figure skating commentators
Members of the Order of Canada
Figure skaters from Montreal
People from Lachine, Quebec
Anglophone Quebec people
HIV/AIDS activists